The Evangelical Baptist Union of Ukraine or All-Ukrainian Union of Churches of Evangelical Christian Baptists (AUC ECB) is a Baptist Christian denomination in Ukraine. It is affiliated with the Baptist World Alliance. The headquarters is in Kyiv.

History

The All-Ukrainian Union of Churches of Evangelical Christian-Baptists has its origins in a believer's baptism movement in the 19th century. In 1918, the All-Ukrainian Union of Baptists was founded. In 1922, it became associated with Russian Union of Evangelical Christians-Baptists. It was officially reorganized in 1990 and became independent of the Russian Union of Evangelical Christians-Baptists. According to a denomination census released in 2022, it claimed 2,272 churches and 113,000 members.

See also

 Baptists in Ukraine
 Baptist Union of Poland
 Brotherhood of Independent Baptist Churches and Ministries of Ukraine
 List of Baptist denominations
 Ukrainian Evangelical Baptist Convention of Canada
 Union of Christian Evangelical Baptist Churches of Moldova
 Union of Evangelical Christians-Baptists of Russia

References

External links
 Official Website

Evangelicalism in Ukraine
Baptist denominations in Europe
Baptist denominations established in the 20th century
Baptist Christianity in Ukraine